The 1900–01 WPHL season was the fourth season of operation for the Western Pennsylvania Hockey League. Four Pittsburgh-area teams competed in the season, in which all games were played at the Duquesne Gardens. The hockey team of the Keystone Bicycle Club was admitted to the league, replacing Western University (today known as the University of Pittsburgh). The 1900-01 season also marked the final season of the Duquesne Country & Athletic Club's team.

The Pittsburgh Athletic Club repeated as the league champion to win their third consecutive and final league title.

Final standings

References

Western Pennsylvania Hockey League seasons
WPHL